The Institute of Southern Punjab (ISP) is a private university in Multan, Punjab, Pakistan. It was established in 2010.

The university offers a wide range of undergraduate and graduate programs in various disciplines which include Management Sciences, Faculty of Engineering, Faculty of Arts and Social Sciences, Faculty of Life Sciences, and Faculty of Computer Science and Information Technology.

External links
 ISP official website

Universities and colleges in Multan
Engineering universities and colleges in Pakistan